The United States District Court for the Eastern District of Texas (in case citations, E.D. Tex.) is a federal court in the Fifth Circuit (except for patent claims and claims against the U.S. government under the Tucker Act, which are appealed to the Federal Circuit).

The District was established on February 21, 1857, with the division of the state into an Eastern and Western District.

Organization of the court 

The United States District Court for the Eastern District of Texas is one of four federal judicial districts in Texas. Court for the District is held at Beaumont, Lufkin, Marshall, Plano, Sherman, Texarkana, and Tyler.

Beaumont Division comprises the following counties: Hardin, Jasper, Jefferson, Liberty, Newton, and Orange.

Lufkin Division comprises the following counties: Angelina, Houston, Nacogdoches, Polk, Sabine, San Augustine, Shelby, Trinity, and Tyler.

Marshall Division comprises the following counties: Camp, Cass, Harrison, Marion, Morris, and Upshur.

Sherman Division comprises the following counties: Collin, Cooke, Delta, Denton, Fannin, Grayson, Hopkins, and Lamar.

Texarkana Division comprises the following counties: Bowie, Franklin, Red River, and Titus.

Tyler Division comprises the following counties: Anderson, Cherokee, Gregg, Henderson, Panola, Rains, Rusk, Smith, Van Zandt, and Wood.

The United States Attorney's Office for the Eastern District of Texas represents the United States in civil and criminal litigation in the court. The United States Attorney is Brit Featherston.

History 

The first federal judge in Texas was John C. Watrous, who was appointed on May 26, 1846, and had previously served as Attorney General of the Republic of Texas.  He was assigned to hold court in Galveston, at the time, the largest city in the state.  As seat of the Texas Judicial District, the Galveston court had jurisdiction over the whole state.

Patent litigation 
The Eastern District of Texas currently hears the most patent cases in the country and has seen an increase in the number of cases filed relating to patent infringement, notably in the courts of Judge T. John Ward in the Marshall Division, Judge Leonard Davis in the Tyler Division, and Judge David Folsom in the Texarkana Division and now Judge J. Rodney Gilstrap in the Marshall Division and Judge Robert W. Schroeder III in the Texarkana Division, as well as Magistrate Judges Roy S. Payne, John Love and K. Nicole Mitchell.  Perhaps because the district has a set of local rules for patent cases and relatively fast trial settings, patent plaintiffs have flocked to this small venue. In addition the proximity to larger cities (such as Dallas and Houston), along with a jury pool interested in protecting property rights, may attract patent cases to Marshall, Tyler, and Texarkana.

In 2003, there were 14 patent cases filed.  In 2004, this number more than quadrupled to 59 patent cases filed.  In 2006, the number of cases grew to an estimated 236.

The district has been perceived to be a favorable jurisdiction for plaintiffs in patent infringement lawsuits, which win 88% of the time compared to a nationwide average of 68% in 2006, even, according to some claims, in dubious cases (i.e. patent trolls).

Between 2004 and 2011 the district presided over TiVo Inc. v. EchoStar Corp., involving the issues of patent infringement and contempt of court.

In 2009 Judge Leonard Davis, of the U.S. District Court for the Eastern District of Texas, ordered a permanent injunction that "prohibits Microsoft from selling or importing to the United States any Microsoft Word products that have the capability of opening .XML, .DOCX or DOCM files (XML files) containing custom XML," according to an announcement by the plaintiff, Toronto-based i4i Inc.

In 2013, 24.5% of federal patent suits filed in the U.S. were filed in the Eastern District. Judges in this district have been found to grant requests for summary judgment of invalidity at a lower rate than the national average.

In 2014, 1,425 patent suits in the U.S. were filed in the Eastern District, making it the number one region with the most filings in the country, followed by the United States District Court for the District of Delaware in second place, with 946 patent cases filed, with the United States District Court for the Central District of California ranking third with 305 cases.

In 2015, a staggering 43.6% of federal patent suits (2,540 suits) were filed in the Eastern District, which was more than the number of lawsuits filed in the United States District Court for the District of Delaware (545 cases or 9.3%), the United States District Court for the Central District of California (300 cases or 5.1%), the United States District Court for the Northern District of California (228 cases or 3.9%) and the United States District Court for the Northern District of Illinois (162 cases or 2.8%) combined. 

In 2016, 1,647 cases (or 36.4%) of the nation's patent cases were filed in the Eastern District, which was again more than the total number of lawsuits filed in the District of Delaware (455 cases or 10.1%), Central District of California (290 cases or 6.4%), Northern District of Illinois (247 cases or 5.5%) and Northern District of California (188 cases or 4.2%) combined.

The vast majority of the patent cases in the Eastern District of Texas are filed before or heard in the Marshall, Texas division by District Court Judge James Rodney Gilstrap and Magistrate Judge Roy S. Payne. U.S. District Judge Robert W. Schroeder III in the Texarkana Division, and Magistrate Judges John Love and K. Nicole Mitchell hear the next highest number of patent cases in the District.

The filing of such cases in the Eastern District of Texas dropped after the 2017 Supreme Court decision in TC Heartland LLC v. Kraft Foods Group Brands LLC, which held that for the purpose of venue in patent infringement suits, a domestic corporation "resides" only in its state of incorporation. Meanwhile, the filing of such cases in the United States District Court for the District of Delaware increased.

Current judges 
:

Former judges

Chief judges

Succession of seats

See also 
 Courts of Texas
 List of current United States district judges
 List of United States federal courthouses in Texas

References

External links 
 United States District Court for the Eastern District of Texas

Courthouses in Texas
Texas, Eastern District
Texas law
Angelina County, Texas
Beaumont, Texas
Bowie County, Texas
Grayson County, Texas
Marshall, Texas
Texarkana, Texas
Tyler, Texas
United States patent law
1857 establishments in Texas
Courts and tribunals established in 1857